The 2017 Swiss Open Gstaad (also known as the 2017 J. Safra Sarasin Swiss Open Gstaad for sponsorship reasons) was a men's tennis tournament played on outdoor clay courts. It was the 50th edition of the Swiss Open, and part of the ATP World Tour 250 Series of the 2017 ATP World Tour. It took place at the Roy Emerson Arena in Gstaad, Switzerland, from 24 July through 30 July 2017.

Singles main draw entrants

Seeds 

 1 Rankings are as of July 17, 2017

Other entrants 
The following players received wildcards into the singles main draw:
  Antoine Bellier
  Marco Chiudinelli
  Fabio Fognini

The following players received entry from the qualifying draw:
  Daniel Brands 
  Lorenzo Giustino 
  Yannick Hanfmann 
  Gleb Sakharov

Withdrawals
Before the tournament
  Jérémy Chardy →replaced by  Santiago Giraldo
  Marius Copil →replaced by  Ernests Gulbis
  Viktor Troicki →replaced by  Radu Albot

Doubles main draw entrants

Seeds 

 Rankings are as of July 17, 2017

Other entrants 
The following pairs received wildcards into the doubles main draw:
  Antoine Bellier /  Luca Margaroli 
  Dustin Brown /  Marco Chiudinelli

Champions

Singles 

  Fabio Fognini def.  Yannick Hanfmann 6–4, 7–5.

Doubles 

  Oliver Marach /  Philipp Oswald def.  Jonathan Eysseric /  Franko Škugor 6–3, 4–6, [10–8].

External links 
 

Swiss Open Gstaad
Swiss Open (tennis)
2017 in Swiss tennis
July 2017 sports events in Europe